The below table gives a list of firearms that can fire the 5.56×45mm NATO cartridge, first developed and used in the late 1970s for the M16 rifle, which to date, is the most widely produced weapon in this caliber. Not all countries that use weapons chambered in this caliber are in NATO.

This table is sortable for every column.

See also 
List of assault rifles
7.62×39mm
5.45×39mm
5.8×42mm

References

NATO 5.56x45mm